The 1973 St. Louis Cardinals season was the franchise's 54th season in the National Football League (NFL). Led by first-year head coach Don Coryell, the Cardinals matched their previous output of 4–9–1, finishing with that record for the third straight season. They failed to reach the playoffs for the 25th straight season (not counting an appearance in the Playoff Bowl following the 1964 season).

The game vs. the Oakland Raiders was the first between the teams, and the last until 1983, by which time the Raiders have moved to Los Angeles. It would be the last time the Raiders played at the Cardinals until 1998 in Tempe, Arizona, and the Raiders' last game in St. Louis until 2002 when they played the Rams.

Their tied game, their first NFL game against the Denver Broncos, was the nearest they would come to beating that franchise until 2010, and the only time the Broncos would play at Busch Memorial Stadium (they would play at Edward Jones Dome in 2000).

Hired in January, Coryell was previously the head coach at San Diego State for twelve seasons.

Roster

Schedule

Standings

References 

Arizona Cardinals seasons
St. Louis Cardinals